Whibley is a surname. Notable people with the surname include:

Charles Whibley (1859–1930), English literary journalist and author
Deryck Whibley, Canadian musician and producer
Ethel Whibley (1861–1920), secretary and model to the artist Whistler
Fred Whibley (1855–1919), English island trader
John Whibley (1891–1972), English footballer
Leonard Whibley (1864–1941), English classical scholar

English-language surnames